Beijing Today is a weekly English newspaper catering to expatriates and embassies that covers current events, art, cinema, music, dining, and shopping in Beijing.

The newspaper is run by the publisher of Beijing Youth Daily.

It is assigned the Chinese Issue Number CN11-0120.

History

Beijing Today began publication in May 2001 as a 16-page broadsheet newspaper. Its initial incarnation focused on hard news and was positioned to compete with China Daily in the Beijing market.

In May 2005, the paper was redesigned as a 32-page compact with a stronger focus on art and culture, as well as events at local embassies. The print size contracted to 24 pages in 2006 and 16 pages in January 2012.

In December 2011, Beijing Today Media became wholly owned by Beijing Education Media, another subsidiary of the Beijing Youth Daily Group. As part of its transition to Beijing Education Media, Beijing Today began publishing an 8-page edition packaged together with a new 8-page paper called Teens Post.

Teens Post ran its final issue on July 19, 2013, and Beijing Today resumed a 16-page print run. The current incarnation splits content between two sections: Beijing Today Metro and Beijing Today News.

See also

 List of newspapers in the People's Republic of China
 Media of the People's Republic of China
 Global Times
 China Daily
 Shanghai Daily
 Shenzhen Daily

References

External links
 Beijing Today (in English)

Newspapers published in Beijing
English-language newspapers published in China
Publications established in 2001
2001 establishments in China
Weekly newspapers published in China